This is a list of all tornadoes that were confirmed by local offices of the National Weather Service in the United States in July 2010.

United States yearly total

July

July 1 event
 These tornadoes were associated with Hurricane Alex.

July 2 event (South)
 This tornado was associated with remnant moisture from Hurricane Alex.

July 2 event (North)

July 3 event

July 4 event

July 6 event (South)

July 6 event (North)

July 7 event

July 10 event

July 11 event

July 12 event

July 13 event

July 14 event

July 15 event

July 16 event

July 17 event

July 18 event

July 19 event

July 20 event

July 21 event

July 22 event

July 23 event

July 24 event

July 25 event

July 26 event

July 27 event

July 29 event

July 31 event

See also
Tornadoes of 2010

References

 07
2010, 07
Tornadoes